The following Confederate Army units and commanders fought in the Battle of Mine Creek of the American Civil War. The Union order of battle is listed separately.

Abbreviations used

Military rank
 MG = Major General
 BG = Brigadier General
 Col = Colonel
 Ltc = Lieutenant Colonel
 Maj = Major
 Cpt = Captain
 Lt = 1st Lieutenant

Other
 c = captured

Army of Missouri
MG Sterling Price

References
 Buresh, Lumir F. October 25 and the Battle of Mine Creek (Kansas City, MO:  The Lowell Press), 1977.  
 Monnett, Howard N. Action Before Westport: 1864 (Niwot, CO:  University Press of Colorado), 1995. [revised edition]

External links
 Artist Rendition of Battle
 Mine Creek Battlefield State Historic Site

American Civil War orders of battle